This article shows the Qualifying Draw for the 2011 New Haven Open at Yale.

Players

Seeds

Qualifiers

Lucky losers
  Carla Suárez Navarro

Qualifying draw

First qualifier

Second qualifier

Third qualifier

Fourth qualifier

References
 Qualifying Draw

New Haven Open at Yale Singles Qualifying
Singles Qualifying